Gault is a clay formation around the south-east of England.

Gault may also refer to:

 Gault (surname), real and fictional people
 6478 Gault, an asteroid
 Gault (archaeological site), a pre-Clovis archaeological site in Texas 
 Gault Millau, a series of restaurant guides
 Gault Wood, a woodland in Cambridgeshire, England
 In re Gault, a 1967 US Supreme Court ruling establishing juveniles' rights in court

See also
 Galt (disambiguation)